The 2014 New South Wales Swifts season saw New South Wales Swifts compete in the 2014 ANZ Championship. Rob Wright replaced Lisa Beehag as head coach. Swifts finished the regular season in third place but subsequently lost to Waikato Bay of Plenty Magic in the minor semi-final.

Players

Player movements

Notes
  Sarah Wall previously played for Melbourne Vixens and Queensland Firebirds.

2014 roster

Debutants
 Sharni Layton, Abbey McCulloch and Caitlin Thwaites all make their New South Wales Swifts debut in Round 1 against West Coast Fever.
 Maddie Hay and Brooke Miller both make their Swifts and ANZ Championship debut in Round 2 against Canterbury Tactix. 
 Taylah Davies and Micaela Wilson both make their Swifts debut in Round 3 against Adelaide Thunderbirds. 
 Sarah Wall made her Swifts debut in Round 4 against Queensland Firebirds. 
 Gretel Tippett made her Swifts debut in Round 5 against Central Pulse.

Gold medallists
Kimberlee  Green, Sharni  Layton and Caitlin Thwaites were all members of the Australia team that won the gold medal at the   2014 Commonwealth Games.

Regular season

Fixtures and results
Round 1

Round 2

Round 3

Round 4

Round 5

Round 6
New South Wales Swifts received a bye.
Round 7

Round 8

Round 9

Round 10

Round 11

Round 12

Round 13

Round 14

Standings

Play-offs

Minor semi-final

Award winners

NSW Swifts awards

ANZ Championship awards

Notes
  Award was shared with Joanne Harten (Waikato Bay of Plenty Magic).

All Stars

References

New South Wales Swifts seasons
New South Wales Swifts